Reggie Durden (born November 22, 1976) is a former gridiron football defensive back. He was born on November 11, 1976, in Houston, Texas.

College career
Reggie Durden played two seasons at Florida State University. In 1999, he shared the Most Improved Player honors at cornerback. He also returned punts and kickoffs for the seminoles, and had 2 interceptions and 13 tackles in 1998.

Professional career
Durden joined the Montreal Alouettes in 2001 as a punt returner after a season with the Los Angeles Xtreme of the XFL. Before the 2006 CFL season, Durden was traded from the Montreal Alouettes to the Edmonton Eskimos. He played one season with the Eskimos before being released.

Personal life
Currently Durden is a football coach at a Grantham middle school

References

1976 births
American football cornerbacks
Florida State Seminoles football players
Montreal Alouettes players
Edmonton Elks players
Canadian football defensive backs
Living people
American players of Canadian football
Los Angeles Xtreme players